In a bankmail agreement, a company engaged in a takeover bid makes an agreement with a bank that the bank would only finance their possible bid, and not that of a rival attempt to acquire the takeover target.

See also
 Mergers and acquisitions
 Takeover

References

Corporate finance